Jack Epps is a former professional American football player who played defensive back for one season for the  Kansas City Chiefs

References

1963 births
Living people
Sportspeople from Tulsa, Oklahoma
Players of American football from Oklahoma
American football cornerbacks
Kansas State Wildcats football players
Kansas City Chiefs players
National Football League replacement players